Ingrīda Priedīte ( Bērziņa, born March 13, 1954, in Rīga) is a Latvian female chess player who holds the ICCF title of Lady Grandmaster (LGM, 1997) and the FIDE title of Woman FIDE Master (WFM, 2014). She is a two-time winner of the Latvian Chess Championship for women (1973 and 1979).

Priedīte started to play chess at the age of 9. She won the Latvian Junior championship in 1970, Riga women championship in 1972, Latvian Student championship in 1974 and 1977, and achieved Master title in 1976.

In her later years, Priedīte is also an excellent correspondence chess player.  She was second in the 5th Ladies World Championship final (1993–1998).

Priedīte graduated from the Latvian University and is an economist by profession. After Latvian restoration of independence in 1991 she was the first General-Secretary of the Latvian Chess Federation.

References

 Žuravļevs, N.; Dulbergs, I.; Kuzmičovs, G. (1980), Latvijas šahistu jaunrade, Rīga, Avots., pp. 94 – 95

External links
 
 
 
 Ingrīda Priedīte player profile at Latvian Correspondence Chess Federation 

1954 births
Living people
Latvian female chess players
Soviet female chess players
Chess Woman FIDE Masters
University of Latvia alumni
Sportspeople from Riga